The 2018–19 season was the 113th season in the existence of RC Lens and the club's fourth consecutive season in the second division of French football. In addition to the domestic league, Lens participated in this season's editions of the Coupe de France and the Coupe de la Ligue. The season was scheduled to cover the period from 1 July 2018 to 30 June 2019.

Players

First-team squad

Out on loan

Pre-season and friendlies

Competitions

Overview

Ligue 2

League table

Results summary

Results by round

Matches

Coupe de France

Coupe de la Ligue

References

RC Lens seasons
Lens